Janice Marjorie Lord is a New Zealand academic, a plant evolutionary biologist, and as of 2020 is an associate professor at the University of Otago, where she is the curator of the Otago Regional Herbarium.

Academic career

After a PhD titled The evolutionary ecology of Festuca novae-zelandiae in mid-Canterbury, New Zealand, submitted to the University of Canterbury in 1992, Lord moved to the Department of Botany at the University of Otago, where she is an associate professor.

Lord's research focuses on how the New Zealand fauna have shaped plant flora through pollination and fruit dispersal systems. She has worked particularly on alpine plant communities, but has also published on subantarctic megaherbs, and the use of traditional knowledge of native plants in botany. She is also interested in mycorrhizal flora for ecological restoration, and carbon sequestration by native plants. She is a principal investigator for the 1 Billion Trees project, and is part of the Otago Climate Change Network.

Lord received the Leonard Cockayne Lecture Award in 2015; she was only the second female recipient after Lucy Moore won the first award in 1965. Lord gave her lectures on subantarctic flora.

In 2017, Lord featured as one of the Royal Society Te Apārangi's 150 women in 150 words, celebrating the contributions of women to knowledge in New Zealand.

Selected works

References

External links
  
 
2016 podcast from the BBC series "Planet Earth II" featuring Lord talking about her interest in subantarctic megaherbs  

New Zealand women academics
University of Canterbury alumni
Academic staff of the University of Otago
20th-century New Zealand botanists
Year of birth missing (living people)
Living people

New Zealand women botanists
21st-century New Zealand botanists
20th-century New Zealand women scientists